Synnøve Lie (22 August 1908 – 9 July 1980) was a Norwegian speed skater.

Biography
Representing Oslo Skøiteklub (Oslo Skating Club), Lie became Norwegian Allround Champion in 1933 after having already won the unofficial Norwegian Allround Championships the year before. At the unofficial 1933 World Allround Championships, she won silver, something she would repeat in 1935, while in 1934, she won bronze. In 1936, the World Allround Championships became official and Lie won the bronze medal there. In 1937, she would win silver and in 1938 bronze again.

Medals
An overview of medals won by Lie at important championships she participated in, listing the years in which she won each:

Note that the World Allround Championships were unofficial from 1933 to 1935 and that the Norwegian Allround Championships were unofficial in 1932.

World records
Over the course of her career, Lie skated five world records:

Norwegian records
Over the course of her career, Lie skated seven Norwegian records:

Personal records
To put these personal records in perspective, the WR column lists the official world records on the dates that Lie skated her personal records.

Note that Lie's personal records on the 1,000 m, the 3,000 m, and the 5,000 m were not world records because in all three cases Laila Schou Nilsen skated faster at the same tournament. Nilsen's respective times were 1:38.8, 5:29.6, and 9:28.3. Also note that the Old combination was not an official world record event, as governed by the International Skating Union, until 1949.

References

 Eng, Trond. All Time International Championships, Complete Results: 1889 - 2002. Askim, Norway: WSSSA-Skøytenytt, 2002.
 Eng, Trond; Gjerde, Arild and Teigen, Magne. Norsk Skøytestatistikk Gjennom Tidene, Menn/Kvinner, 1999 (6. utgave). Askim/Skedsmokorset/Veggli, Norway: WSSSA-Skøytenytt, 1999. 
 Eng, Trond; Gjerde, Arild; Teigen, Magne and Teigen, Thorleiv. Norsk Skøytestatistikk Gjennom Tidene, Menn/Kvinner, 2004 (7. utgave). Askim/Skedsmokorset/Veggli/Hokksund, Norway: WSSSA-Skøytenytt, 2004. 
 Eng, Trond and Teigen, Magne. Komplette Resultater fra offisielle Norske Mesterskap på skøyter, 1894 - 2005. Askim/Veggli, Norway: WSSSA-Skøytenytt, 2005.
 Teigen, Magne. Komplette Resultater Norske Mesterskap På Skøyter, 1887 - 1989: Menn/Kvinner, Senior/Junior. Veggli, Norway: WSSSA-Skøytenytt, 1989.
 Teigen, Magne. Komplette Resultater Internasjonale Mesterskap 1889 - 1989: Menn/Kvinner, Senior/Junior, allround/sprint. Veggli, Norway: WSSSA-Skøytenytt, 1989.

External links 
 
 Synnøve Lie at SkateResults.com
 Historical World Records. International Skating Union.
 National Championships results. Norges Skøyteforbund (Norwegian Skating Association).

1908 births
1980 deaths
Norwegian female speed skaters
World record setters in speed skating
World Allround Speed Skating Championships medalists